The 1997–98 Washington Capitals season saw the team reach the Stanley Cup Finals for the first time in club history. Peter Bondra's 52 goals led the team; veterans Dale Hunter, Joe Juneau, and Adam Oates returned to old form; and Olaf Kölzig had a solid .920 save percentage as the Caps got past the Boston Bruins, Ottawa Senators and Buffalo Sabres (the latter on a dramatic overtime win in Game 6 on a goal by Juneau) en route to the team's first Stanley Cup Finals appearance. The Capitals won five overtime games, two against the Bruins and three against Sabres. However, they were no match for the defending cup champs, the Detroit Red Wings, who won in a four-game sweep. It was also the team’s first year at the MCI Center.

Offseason

Regular season
 Adam Oates, Phil Housley and Dale Hunter, all scored their 1,000th career point, the only time in NHL history that one team had three different players reach that same milestone in a single season.

The Capitals had a very effective penalty kill during the regular season, allowing the fewest power-play goals (39) and finishing with the highest penalty-kill percentage (89.23%).

Season standings

Schedule and results

Playoffs

Eastern Conference Quarterfinals

Eastern Conference semifinals

Eastern Conference finals

Stanley Cup Finals

Player statistics

Regular season
Scoring

Goaltending

Playoffs
Scoring

Goaltending

Note: GP = Games played; G = Goals; A = Assists; Pts = Points; +/- = Plus/minus; PIM = Penalty minutes; PPG=Power-play goals; SHG=Short-handed goals; GWG=Game-winning goals
      MIN=Minutes played; W = Wins; L = Losses; T = Ties; GA = Goals against; GAA = Goals against average; SO = Shutouts; SA=Shots against; SV=Shots saved; SV% = Save percentage;

Awards and records

Transactions

Draft picks

Below are the Washington Capitals' selections at the 1997 NHL Entry Draft, held on June 21, 1997 at the Civic Arena in Pittsburgh, Pennsylvania.

Farm teams
Portland Pirates

See also
 1997–98 NHL season

References
 Capitals on Hockey Database

W
W
Eastern Conference (NHL) championship seasons
Washington Capitals seasons
Wash
Cap
Cap